Western Railway may refer to:

 Western Railway (Austria)
 Hanoverian Western Railway, Germany
 Western Railway zone, on Indian Railways
 Württemberg Western Railway, Germany

See also
 Great Western Railway, England
 West Coast Wilderness Railway, Tasmania
 Western Railroad (disambiguation)
 Western Railway Corridor, Ireland
 Western Railway Museum, California, United States